Follow That Horse! is a 1960 British comedy film directed by Alan Bromly from a screenplay by William Douglas-Home. It stars David Tomlinson, Cecil Parker, Richard Wattis, Mary Peach and  Dora Bryan. Various parties including scientists and spies chase after a horse that has eaten a roll of microfilm.

Cast
 David Tomlinson as Dick Lanchester
 Cecil Parker as Sir William Crane
 Richard Wattis as Hugh Porlock
 Mary Peach as Susan Turner
 Dora Bryan as Miss Bradstock
 Raymond Huntley as Special Branch Chief
 Sam Kydd as Farrell
 George Pravda as Hammler
 John Welsh as Major Turner
 Peter Copley as Garrod
 Cyril Shaps as Dr. Spiegel
 Victor Brooks as Blake
 Vic Wise as Riley
 George A. Cooper as Rudd
 Arthur Lowe as Auctioneer (uncredited)

Critical reception
TV Guide gave the film two out of four stars, calling it "Harmlessly silly."

References

External links

1960 films
1960 comedy films
British comedy films
Films shot at Associated British Studios
1960s English-language films
1960s British films